Walter Kamba (6 September 1931 – 18 May 2007) was a Zimbabwean lawyer and academic, one of the few black lawyers practicing in the then British colony of Rhodesia. He fled following the Unilateral Declaration of Independence by Prime Minister Ian Smith. He joined the Faculty of Law at the University of Dundee, Scotland in 1969, where he taught Jurisprudence and Comparative Law. He was promoted to Senior Lecturer and in 1977 became Dean of the Faculty. He was awarded an honorary degree by the University in 1982 as part of its centenary celebrations.

He served as a legal advisor to the ZANU-PF and PF-ZAPU delegations at the Lancaster House Conference. After independence, he served as principal and vice-chancellor of the University of Zimbabwe from 1981 to 1992. Under his tenure, the University expanded its overall size, its intake of black Zimbabweans and the range of academic disciplines offered. He resigned in a controversial speech at the 1992 graduation, citing government interference and threats to academic freedom.

His wife Angeline, who died in 2017 aged 81, was a distinguished national and international administrator.

References

External links
Video about Walter and Angeline Kamba produced by the University of Dundee

Heads of universities and colleges in Zimbabwe
1931 births
2007 deaths
Academics of the University of Dundee
Academic staff of the University of Zimbabwe
20th-century Zimbabwean lawyers
Rhodesian lawyers
21st-century Zimbabwean lawyers